Aaron Roland Mosher CBE (May 10, 1881 — September 26, 1959) was a Canadian labour leader and trade unionist. In 1908, he became founding president of the Canadian Brotherhood of Railway Employees, a position he held until 1952.

The racist policies of the CBRE under Mosher led to the formation of the Canadian affiliate of the all-black Brotherhood of Sleeping Car Porters.

For his work during World War II, he was made a Commander in the Order of the British Empire. In 1981, commemorating the centenary of his birth, a postage stamp was issued depicting Mosher flanked by two railway workers.

See also
 Black Canadians

References

1881 births
1959 deaths
Canadian trade union leaders
Canadian Commanders of the Order of the British Empire